Tympanophora is a genus of bush-crickets, known as balloon-winged katydids, found in Australia. It is the only extant (living) genus in the subfamily Tympanophorinae.

Species
The genus contains the following species:
Tympanophora aka Rentz, 2001
Tympanophora andreae Rentz, 2001
Tympanophora diminuta Riek, 1976
Tympanophora houstoni Rentz, 2001
Tympanophora insolita Riek, 1976
Tympanophora kalbarri Rentz, 2001
Tympanophora ourapilla Rentz, 2001
Tympanophora pellucida White, 1841
Tympanophora picta Riek, 1976
Tympanophora pinnaroo Rentz, 2001
Tympanophora rotto Rentz, 2001
Tympanophora similis Riek, 1976
Tympanophora splendida Riek, 1976
Tympanophora uvarovi Zeuner, 1936

References

Tettigoniidae
Orthoptera genera